Santifaller is an Italian surname and infers from the village Santuel located in the Italian Alps Brixen. Notable people with the surname include:

 Leo Santifaller (1890–1974), Austrian historian

Italian-language surnames
Toponymic surnames